Coppers, named both for police officers as well as the creator's surname, and also known as Rough Justice in English-speaking countries, is a Belgian television crime drama. In both the U.S., and the UK, the series is shown on Walter Presents.

Cast

Main
Hilde De Baerdemaeker – Commissaris Liese Meerhout
Luk Wyns – Hoofdinspecteur Michel Masson
Lotte Pinoy – Hoofdinspecteur Sofie Jacobs
Bert Verbeke – Inspecteur Laurent Vandenbergh

Recurring
Joris Hessels – Wetsdokter Fabian Steppe
Arnold Willems – Paul Meerhout
Rudy Morren – Hoofdcommissaris Frank Torfs
Abigail Abraham – Baïna Mpenzi
Christiaens Annick – Carine D'Hooren
Robbie Cleiren – Freddy Steveniers
Mathias Sercu – Pierre Bouwens
Sura Dohnke – Sura Droste
Gert Winckelmans – Benoit Nollet

References

External links
 

Belgian crime television series
Belgian drama television shows
2016 Belgian television series debuts
2016 Belgian television series endings
2010s Belgian television series
Flemish television shows
VTM (TV channel) original programming